James Dunnison is a Canadian film and television director, whose works include Stuff, Todd and the Book of Pure Evil (7 episodes), and Less Than Kind (14 episodes), as well as individual episodes of Carter, Bitten, Blood Ties, Hiccups, Arctic Air, Godiva’s, Whistler and Robson Arms. In 1998, he took the Grand Prize at the Cabbagetown Short Film & Video Festival, and he has additionally received the General Idea Award for Artistic Contribution to AIDS Awareness, three Gemini Awards, three Directors Guild of Canada Awards, two Canadian Comedy Awards and multiple Leo Awards.

References

Harris, Bill (September 28, 2010). "'Book of Pure Evil' is pure fun". Winnipeg Sun. Retrieved September 28, 2010.
Ostroff, Joshua, "The fall and rise of CanCom"; Eye Weekly, October 8, 2008
Thomas, Kevin, "'Tierra del Fuego' Opens Hitchcock Director's Series"; Los Angeles Times, June 22, 2000
Dinoff, Distin, "WIFF hit Stuff unspools at VIFF"; Playback, September 20, 1999

External links
 
 

Canadian film directors
Living people
Year of birth missing (living people)
Canadian television directors
Canadian Comedy Award winners